Duncan Otieno (born 26 May 1994) is a Kenyan international footballer who plays for Zambian club Lusaka Dynamos, as a midfielder.

Career
Born in Nairobi, he has played club football for A.F.C. Leopards, Posta Rangers, Nkana and Lusaka Dynamos.

He made his international debut for Kenya in 2017.

References

1994 births
Living people
Footballers from Nairobi
Kenyan footballers
Kenya international footballers
A.F.C. Leopards players
Posta Rangers F.C. players
Nkana F.C. players
Lusaka Dynamos F.C. players
Kenyan Premier League players
Association football midfielders
Kenyan expatriate footballers
Kenyan expatriate sportspeople in Zambia
Expatriate footballers in Zambia